Mulla Hamzah Gilani (d. 1721/22; 1134 AH) was an Iranian shia philosopher. He was one of the pupils of Muhammad Sadiq Ardestani.

Life
He was come from Gilan province but most of his life has been passed in Isfahan because of this, he also called as isfahani. It is not clear when he was born but according to Hazin lahiji, Molla Hamzeh died around 1134 lunar Hijrah. there is little information about his life in the main sources.

Education
He was one of the best pupils of Ardestani. However he was skillful in  Islamic philosophy even in the period of his teacher. Ashtyani knows him among philosophers who try to continue the philosophy of Molla sadra and also  endeavor to  defend of it versus critics. He counted as one of the important philosophers of Isfahan school.

Works
He left some works both in Peripatetic philosophy and also about philosophy of Mulla Sadra. Some of his works are:
Hikamte Sadeqiyah
A glosses on The Book of Healing
A treatise on Tashkik
A commentary on Tjrid al eteqad book.
Mulla Hamzeh had written the book of Hikamte Sadeqiyah in which he reported the philosophical courses of Ardestani.

See also
Muslim philosophers
molla Sadra

References

Recourses
Henry Corbin and Sayyed Jalāl-al-Din Āštiāni, eds., Anthologie des philosophes iraniens depuis le XVIIe siècle jusqu’à nos jours/Montaḵabāt-i az āṯār-e ḥokamāʾ-e elāhi-e Irān az ʿaṣr-e Mir Dāmād o Mir Fendereski tā zamān-e ḥāżer, 4 vols., Paris and Tehran, 1971–79.

Islamic philosophers
18th-century Iranian philosophers
17th-century Iranian philosophers